The Apollo Intensa Emozione, sometimes referred as the IE, is a mid-engine sports car manufactured by German automobile manufacturer Apollo Automobil GmbH, in partership with Manifattura Automobili Torino, designed by their chief designer Joe Wang. The name itself means 'intense emotion' in Italian.

This is the first vehicle made by Apollo since the Gumpert Apollo that went into production 14 years before.

Apollo came out with a teaser video for the Intensa Emozione on October 17, 2017  and the car was fully revealed on October 24, 2017. 

The Intensa Emozione will be sold for $2,670,000 in the United States, and €2,300,000 in Europe. Only ten will be produced, all of which have been reportedly sold.

In June 2018 it was revealed that Apollo would be partnering with HWA AG, a tuning and racing team spin-off from Mercedes-Benz tuner AMG, to complete the final stage of development for the car.

Vehicle information

Design language 
The exterior design is based on airflow and nature, insects and marine animals in particular. The interior is based entirely on the nature theme, with a cocoon-style carbon fiber tub cockpit, in the style of a leather-wrapped prototype race car. Apart from the natural thought, the car was also intended to have a design that would stand out from all other sports cars.

Performance data

Specifications and vehicle performance 

The Intensa Emozione uses a Ferrari derived 6.3-litre naturally-aspirated F140FE V12 developed by Autotecnica Motori and HWA AG. The engine reportedly has a redline of 9,000 rpm. All of the power is sent to the rear wheels through a 6-speed Hewland sequential manual transmission.

The dampers are built by Bilstein, and are three-way adjustable (comfort, sport, auto). The car utilises Brembo carbon ceramic brakes with sizes 380 x 34 mm at the front and rear along with 6-piston callipers up front and 4-piston callipers at the rear. Michelin supplies their Sport Cup 2 high performance tires for the cars, to allow for maximum performance and grip. Pankl Racing Systems is the supplier for the differential.

Body construction 
The car is made almost entirely out of carbon fibre, but it does include high-strength steel, aluminium, and titanium components. The engine bay is left uncovered, to allow the air intake to operate with maximum efficiency. The entire chassis weighs only .

Production
Production of the Intensa Emozione started in April 2019 with deliveries beginning in the third quarter of 2019. The carbon fibre monocoque chassis of the car is produced by Capricorn Group and chassis adjustment along with final assembly are carried out by HWA AG. The car is assembled and completed in Affalterbach, Germany where HWA manufactures its race cars.

Its Carbon fibre body colour was changed twice and is currently present in black. The second production Apollo IE was delivered in November 2019. This is also called the "ML" (initials of its Malaysian owner Michael Loke) version due to a very distinct colour scheme. Overall, only 10 Apollo IEs will be produced.

References

External links

Rear mid-engine, rear-wheel-drive vehicles
Sports cars
Cars introduced in 2018
Cars of Germany